The 2014 Cash Converters Players Championship Finals was the seventh edition of the PDC darts tournament, the Players Championship Finals, which saw the top 32 players from the 2014 PDC Pro Tour Order of Merit taking part. The tournament took place at Butlin's Minehead in Minehead, England, between 28–30 November 2014.

Michael van Gerwen was the defending champion, having won his third PDC major title by defeating Phil Taylor 11–7 in the 2013 final, but he lost in the second round to Terry Jenkins.

Gary Anderson won his second major PDC title after beating Adrian Lewis 11–6 in the final.

Qualification
The top 32 players of the PDC Pro Tour Order of Merit qualified for this event.

Prize money

Draw

References

Players Championship Finals
2014 in darts
2014 in English sport
Minehead
Sports competitions in Somerset
2010s in Somerset